Alejandro Muñoz Moreno (April 24, 1922 – December 16, 2000), better known by the ring name Blue Demon (Demonio Azul in Spanish), was a Mexican film actor and luchador enmascarado (Spanish for masked professional wrestler). Blue Demon is considered a legend of lucha libre, partially from starring in a series of Lucha films between 1961 and 1979, often alongside in-ring rival El Santo. His in-ring career began in 1948 and stretched for 41 years until his retirement in 1989.

Throughout his career Muñoz never lost a Lucha de Apuestas match and retired without exposing his face to the public; he would later be buried in his signature blue and silver mask. In his 41-year career he won the NWA World Welterweight Championship twice, the Mexican National Welterweight Championship three times and the Mexican National Tag Team Championship with long time tag team partner Black Shadow. He also won the hair of Cavernario Galindo and the masks of Espectro II, 
Matemático, and most notably, the mask of Rayo de Jalisco.

Near the end of his career Muñoz introduced Blue Demon Jr. to the wrestling world, who despite being promoted as the son of Blue Demon, did not actually share a blood connection to Muñoz; he was later claimed to be the "adopted son". Muñoz's actual son owns the trademarks to the name "Blue Demon", while Blue Demon Jr. owns the trademark to the "Blue Demon Jr." name. Consejo Mundial de Lucha Libre (CMLL) honors the legacy of Blue Demon by holding the Leyenda de Azul ("The Blue Legend") tournament at irregular intervals. He was voted into the Wrestling Observer Newsletter Hall of Fame in 1996 as part of the inaugural HOF selection.

Early life
Alejandro Muñoz Moreno was born April 24, 1922, in García, Nuevo León, Mexico. He was the child of farmers and was the fifth of twelve children. At a young age, Alejandro dropped out of school and moved to Monterrey, where his uncle gave him a job working on the National Railroad. His co-workers gave him the nickname 'Manotas', referring to his large, powerful hands.

Professional wrestling career
A chance meeting with the famous Mexican wrestler Rolando Vera piqued his interest in Lucha Libre, Vera even offering to tutor him and help him start a career. He began wrestling without a mask in Laredo, Texas. His first match was against Chema Lopez on March 12, 1948. Adopting the mask and persona of The Blue Demon, he headed back to Mexico to start a full-time in-ring career. His first appearance as The Blue Demon was in Mexico City in September 1948, where he fought Benny Arcilla. Blue Demon began his career in the ring as a rudo (a bad guy).
 From there, he formed a tag team with another masked luchador named The Black Shadow, and the two became known as Los Hermanos Shadow (The Shadow Brothers).

In 1952, the famous wrestler El Santo beat and unmasked Black Shadow in the ring, which triggered Blue's decision to become a técnico (a good guy) in the ring, and a legendary feud between Blue Demon and El Santo was started. The storyline feud between the two culminated with Blue Demon defeating El Santo in a well-publicized series of matches in 1952 and 1953. In 1953, Blue won the NWA World Welterweight Championship from Santo, and held it until 1958. Their rivalry never entirely abated in later years (although they co-starred in a number of Mexican horror films) since Santo always remembered his defeat at the Blue Demon's hands. During the 1960s, one of Blue Demon's rivals was el Rayo de Jalisco. In 1988, the year he retired, Blue Demon defeated Jalisco in a mask vs. mask match, taking the mask of another of Mexico's wrestling legends. Blue Demon retired from the ring in 1989, aged 67, at the Monterrey Arena, where he appeared in a final match, teaming up with his adoptive son, Blue Demon Jr.

Acting career

Blue Demon first appeared in cameos in a couple of luchador films released in 1961–1962, "The Killers of Lucha Libre" and "Fury in the Ring", in which he was one of several wrestlers more or less in the background. But in 1964, Enrique Vergara, the producer of the then-successful Santo movies, decided to diversify by allowing the 42-year-old Blue Demon to star in a series of luchador films of his own. The plots of the Blue Demon films are thought to be extremely similar to those of Santo's films. Santo was asking for a salary increase at the time and Vergara wanted to cultivate a second movie star. From 1964 to 1979, Blue Demon starred in a total of 25 action/horror/science fiction films. Of those 25 films, Santo co-starred with him in nine of them. In three of his films, Blue Demon starred as the leader of a squadron of masked superheroes known as Los Campeones Justicieros (The Champions of Justice). Membership in the Champions included such legendary Mexican wrestling figures as Blue Demon, Mil Máscaras, Tinieblas, Rayo de Jalisco, El Medico Asesino, El Fantasma Blanco, El Avispon Escarlata and Superzan. In 1989, Blue Demon was the subject of a feature-length Mexican documentary entitled Blue Demon, the Champion (1989).

Death
Muñoz died just before noon on Saturday, December 16, 2000. He suffered a fatal heart attack on a park bench near a subway kiosk while on his way home from his regular morning training session at The Blue Demon Instituto Atletico, where he was teaching others his fighting skills. Although an attempt was made to get him to a hospital, he was unable to be revived. He was 78 years old. Blue Demon was buried wearing his trademark blue mask, which was never removed in public as he always kept his true identity a secret, but before becoming a wrestler, his face was shown when he was 20 years old.

Legacy
Blue Demon is considered one of the biggest legends of lucha libre second only to El Santo in terms of popularity and influence both in and outside of Mexico. The distinctive blue and silver mask of Blue Demon and Blue Demon Jr. is known worldwide and is an instantly recognizable symbol of Lucha Libre. On Wikipedia, The mask icon is used as part of some professional wrestling related tags and notices. On October 27, 2000, CMLL held their first ever Leyenda de Azul ("The Blue Legend") tournament in honor of Blue Demon. The winner of the tournament receives a championship belt that features Blue Demon as well as a plaque with a Blue Demon mask on it. The tournament has been held on a semi-regular basis ever since, The tournament was first endorsed by Blue Demon Jr., and later endorsed by Muñoz' son. Alfredo Muñoz, after Blue Demon Jr. stopped working for CMLL.

Starting in November 2015 Televisa and Sony Pictures Television began airing the first season of the Blue Demon television series featuring a fictionalized version of the early days of his career in the ring and personal life. The third season of the series debuted on April 14, 2017, bringing the episode count to 65. The show debuted in the US in 2017 on UniMás. In 2018, Blue Demon Jr. announced that his son was training for a wrestling career and would be known as "Blue Demon III", hoping to have his son continue the legacy started by Blue Demon.

Championships and accomplishments
Empresa Mexicana de Lucha Libre
Mexican National Tag Team Championship (1 time) – with Black Shadow
Mexican National Welterweight Championship (3 times)
NWA World Welterweight Championship (2 times)
Lucha Libre AAA Worldwide
AAA Hall of Fame (2022)
Wrestling Observer Newsletter
Wrestling Observer Newsletter Hall of Fame (Class of 1996)

Luchas de Apuestas record

Filmography

Footnotes

References

External links
 
 

1922 births
2000 deaths
20th-century Mexican male actors
20th-century professional wrestlers
Masked wrestlers
Mexican male film actors
Mexican male professional wrestlers
Professional wrestlers from Nuevo León
Mexican National Tag Team Champions
Mexican National Welterweight Champions
NWA World Welterweight Champions